Saudi Arabia participated in the 3rd West Asian Games held in Doha, Qatar from December 1, 2005 to December 10, 2005. Saudi Arabia ranked 6th with 4 gold medals and 9 silver medals in this edition of the West Asian Games.

Football 

Saudi Arabia was drawn into the Group B along with Iraq and Kazakhstan. Iraq qualified as Group B winner. Saudi Arabia, being runners-up in the Group B, qualified for the semifinals by winning the toss held between Qatar and Saudi Arabia to decide the "best" runners-up. In the semifinals, Saudi Arabia lost to Iraq and ranked 4th in this event.

Group B matches

Table

Semifinals

Third Place Match

References

West Asian Games
Nations at the 2005 West Asian Games
Saudi Arabia at the West Asian Games